This is a list of cemeteries in the People's Republic of China. Many others—particularly in central urban areas—were destroyed during the Cultural Revolution of the late 1960s and 1970s, which regularized the use of cremation even in the cases of religious minorities such as the Hui. Since the Opening-Up Policy began in the 1980s, mortuary sites have been reopened in more out-lying areas, run as commercial operations.

 Cemetery of Confucius, Shandong
 Babaoshan Revolutionary Cemetery, Beijing
 National Revolutionary Army Memorial Cemetery ("Hope Valley Park"), Jiangsu
 Astana Cemetery, Xinjiang
 Cemetery of Zhaojun, Inner Mongolia
 Mawangdui at Changsha, Hunan
 Foochow Mission Cemetery, Fuzhou
 44 at present in Shanghai, including the Longhua Martyrs' Memorial and the Wanguo Gumou housing the remains of Soong Ching-ling

See also 
 List of cemeteries in Hong Kong
 List of cemeteries in Macau

References